The Second Battle of Rivas occurred on 11 April 1856 between Costa Rican militia under General Mora and the Nicaraguan forces of American mercenary William Walker. The lesser known First Battle of Rivas took place on the 29 June 1855 between Walker's forces and the forces of the Chamorro government of Nicaragua.

Background
At the time, a major trade route between New York City and San Francisco ran through southern Nicaragua. Ships from New York would enter the San Juan River from the Atlantic and sail across Lake Nicaragua.

People and goods would then be transported by stagecoach over a narrow strip of land near the city of Rivas, before reaching the Pacific and being shipped to San Francisco.  The commercial exploitation of this route had been attained from a previous Nicaraguan administration to Wall Street tycoon Cornelius Vanderbilt's Accessory Transit Company. Garrison and Morgan had wrested control of the company from Vanderbilt and then supported Walker's expedition. Vanderbilt spread rumors that the company was issuing stock illegally in order to depress its value, allowing him to regain controlling interest.

In July 1856, Walker set himself up as president of Nicaragua, after conducting a farcical election. As ruler of Nicaragua, Walker then revoked the Transit Company's charter, claiming that it had violated the agreement, and granted use of the route back to Garrison and Morgan.  Outraged, Vanderbilt successfully pressured the U.S. government to withdraw its recognition of Walker's regime. Walker had also scared his neighbors and American and European investors with talk of further military conquests in Central America. Vanderbilt financed and trained a military coalition of these states, led by Costa Rica, and worked to prevent men and supplies from reaching Walker. He also provided defectors from Walker's army with payments and free passage back to the U.S.

Realising that his position was becoming precarious, he sought support from the Southerners in the U.S. by recasting his campaign as a fight to spread the institution of black slavery, which many American Southern businessmen saw as the basis of their agrarian economy. With this in mind, Walker revoked Nicaragua's emancipation edict of 1824. This move did increase Walker's popularity in the South and attracted the attention of Pierre Soulé, an influential New Orleans politician, who campaigned to raise support for Walker's war. Nevertheless, Walker's army, thinned by an epidemic of cholera and massive defections, was no match for the Central American Coalition and Vanderbilt's agents.

Costa Rican President Juan Rafael Mora watched with concern as Walker consolidated his forces and power in Nicaragua.  Fearing that Walker would become unbeatable and at the urging and backing of Vanderbilt's business empire Mora declared war, not on Nicaragua, but on Walker and his filibusters, on the 1 March 1856. Having been talking about the filibusters for a while, Mora made this declaration in a famous speech that begins with the words, "Countrymen, take your weapons, the time that I've been warning you has arrived"  (a paraphrase of the opening words of the Marseillaise).

Enraged Walker ordered the invasion of Costa Rica and a filibuster force crossed the border into Guanacaste, while the Costa Rican army moved down from the Central Valley in the same direction. With the army traveled the President but command was in the hands of his brother, Jose Joaquin Mora, and his brother-in-law, General Cañas. Upon hearing that a small contingent of men were encamped near the city of Guanacaste's Hacienda Santa Rosa Mora led three thousand of his men to attack. Walker's men were under the command of Colonel Louis Schlessinger, an inexperienced officer. On the 20 March with no sentries posted, Mora's Costa Ricans surprised and attacked the small group; Schlessinger himself ran away, leaving his troops vulnerable, disorganised, and without leadership.

Walker alarmed by the defeat heard unfounded rumors that Mora's army was going to attack from the North. So he foolishly decided to abandon the key city of the Nicaragua at that time and meet the army from the north. Mora quickly slipped into Rivas with 3,000 men.

Battle

Walker, just four days after giving up the city, marched his men back into Rivas to try to take it back. His small force was able to score a number of victories through street to street fighting and were able to create a stalemate at a key building in town, El Mesón de Guerra, the Guerra family home, which was located in the corner of the park,  covered the approach to Rivas church; from the towers of the church Walker's snipers enjoyed a wide firing range.

Juan Santamaría

According to the traditional account, on April 11, Salvadoran General José María Cañas suggested that one of the soldiers advance towards the hostel with a torch and set it on fire. Some soldiers tried and failed, but Santamaría finally volunteered on the condition that in the event of his death, someone would look after his mother. He then advanced and was mortally wounded by enemy fire. Before expiring he succeeded, however, in setting fire to the hostel, thus contributing decisively to the Costa Rican victory at Rivas, as the enemy then retreated.

Francisca ("Pancha") Carrasco
Carrasco who was serving the militia as a cook and impromptu medic, filled her apron pockets with bullets, grabbed a discarded rifle and shamed some of the retreating Costa Ricans forestalling what might have become a rout.

Juan Alfaro Ruiz
Juan Alfaro Ruiz was responsible for clearing the filibusters from the church. He died of cholera after the battle. One of Alajuela's cantons was named after him.

Aftermath
Walker and his surviving soldiers fled to Granada during the night. Several factions inside the Costa Rican Army sought to pursue and kill Walker, thus ending the war. President Mora cancelled the plan, seeing his troops were already battle-worn. Mora wanted to use his resources to bury the dead and take care of the wounded and sick. Although Costa Rica was victorious in the Battle of Rivas, the country could not enjoy the victory. Bodies from the fighting were dumped in the wells of the city causing a huge outbreak of cholera.

Thinking the cholera was brought by the hot weather of the Nicaraguan lowlands, the troops wanted to go back home. The Costa Rican troops brought the disease home to Costa Rica with them where it ravaged the entire country, killing one tenth of the population. Mora was blamed for the cholera outbreak, the severe losses inflicted to the army and for the economic damage to the country because of the war debts. A coup was planned for his return to the capital but this was aborted.

The war against Walker would continue, joined now by the armies of other Central American countries under the overall command of General Mora, focused on cutting the men and weapons flow to the filibusters cutting the transit route. After the war, Mora was removed from power in 1859 and executed in 1860 when he tried to come back to power along General Cañas.

References

Bibliography

McCloskey, J. J.  Autobiography of an Old Player contains many references to William Walker.

See also
 First Battle of Rivas
 Battle of Santa Rosa

Rivas
Rivas 1856
Rivas 1856
1856 in Costa Rica
1856 in Nicaragua
April 1856 events